Antonio Francisco Xavier Alvares (Alvares Mar Julius) (29 April 1836 – 23 September 1923) was initially a priest in the Roman Catholic Church in Goa. He joined the Malankara Orthodox Syrian Church and was elevated to Metropolitan of Goa, Ceylon and Greater India in the Malankara Orthodox Syrian Church.

Early life
Alvares was born to a Goan Catholic family in Verna, Goa, Portuguese India.

Priesthood
Alvares was ordained a Roman Catholic priest in 1862 or 1864 by Bishop Walter Steins SJ, Vicar Apostolic in Bombay. Alvares began his ministry in the Archdiocese of Goa under the Archbishop of Goa. The Portuguese Crown claimed these territories by virtue of old privileges of Padroado (papal privilege of royal patronage granted by popes beginning in the 14th century). The more modern Popes and the Congregation for the Propagation of the Faith separated these areas and reorganised them as apostolic vicariates ruled by non-Portuguese bishops, since the English rulers wished to have non-Portuguese bishops.

Successive Portuguese governments fought against this, terming this as unjustified aggression by later Popes against the irrevocable grant of Royal Patronage to the Portuguese Crown, an agitation that spread to the Goan patriots, subjects of the Portuguese Crown.

When, under Pope Pius IX and Pope Leo XIII, the hierarchy in British India was formally reorganised independently of Portugal but with Portuguese consent, a group of pro-Padroado Goan Catholics in Bombay united under the leadership of Dr. Pedro Manoel Lisboa Pinto and Alvares as the Society for the Defense of the Royal Patronage and agitated against the Holy See, the British India government and the Portuguese government in opposition to these changes.

Uniting with Orthodox Church
Their agitation failed to reverse the changes. Angry with the Portuguese government, the group broke away from the Catholic Church and joined the Malankara Orthodox Syrian Church.

Bishop
Alvares was consecrated as Mar Julius I, on 28 July 1889, by the Orthodox Bishop of Kottayam, Paulose Mar Athanasious, with the permission of the Syriac Orthodox Patriarch of Antioch Ignatius Peter IV to be Archbishop of autocephalous Latin Rite of Ceylon, Goa, and India.

While he was a priest of the Catholic Church, he was in search of the true Biblically Christian One, Holy, Catholic, and Apostolic Church. He was against the false devotion and religious exhibitionism. He objected to the Concordat of the Pope and interference of the Government in the Church administration. He could not withstand the harassment meted out to him by the ecclesiastical and civil powers. He went to Western and Eastern Churches and finally came to Maliankara and joined the Malankara Orthodox Syrian Church. Credited with good faith and piety and true regard for others, he was consecrated as bishop by Joseph Mar Dionysius, Geevarghese Mar Gregorios of Parumala, Mar Paulose Ivanios of Kandanadu and Mar Athanasios (Kadavil) in Kottayam on 29 July 1889. He was elevated to Metropolitan Archbishop of Ceylon, Goa and India excluding Malabar.

When Joseph René Vilatte was soliciting for consecration by a bishop with orders recognised by the Catholic Church, he was guided to Alvares, who jointly with Mar Athanasious, and with the permission of the Syriac Orthodox Patriarch, consecrated him in 1892 in Colombo, British Ceylon. This became Alvares' cathedral.

Alvares lived in Colombo, Sri Lanka, in the twin villages of Brahmavar & Kalianpur, Karnataka and finally in Ribandar, Goa where he died of dysentery and was buried.

Pinto, acting in his capacity as the United States Consul, witnessed Alvares' and Vilatte's consecrations.

In Portuguese Goa
Since Alvares was not allowed by the rulers to work freely in Goa. he was mostly based in Canara region of Karnataka with the main base at Brahmavar. He along with Rev. Fr. Roque Zephrin Noronha worked among the people along the west coast of India from Mangalore to Bombay. About 5000 families joined the Orthodox Church. He ordained Rev. Fr. Joseph Kanianthra, Rev. Fr. Lukose Kannamcote and Deacon David Kunnamkulam at Brahmawar on 15 October 1911.

Alvares and Pinto continued their efforts to draw many Goans from the Imperial Church and to Orthodoxy. The Brahmavar (Goan) Orthodox Church (BOC) failed in this goal, for outside this group very few Goans moved to this sect.

In British Ceylon
Alvares was in Ceylon (Sri Lanka) for more than five years. While there he consecrated Vilatte as bishop in the presence of Mar Gregorios of Parumala in 1892.

The denomination that consecrated Vilatte was a part of the Malankara Syriac Orthodox Church that had a Latin Rite patrimony. V. Nagam Aiya wrote, in Travancore State Manual, that Alvares "describe[d] his Church as the Latin branch of the Syriac Church of Antioch."

The Holy See sought to consolidate two co-existing jurisdictions, the Padroado jurisdiction and the Congregation for Propagation of the Faith jurisdiction. The Padroado was the privilege of patronage extended to Portugal which granted the right of designating candidates for episcopal and other offices and benefices in Africa and the East Indies; in addition, it was an exchange of a portion of ecclesiastical revenues for missionaries and endowments to religious establishments in those territories. In time it was seen by the Holy See as an obstacle to missions: the Portuguese government failed to observe the conditions of the agreement; disagreed about the extent of the patronage by claiming the agreement was restricted by Pope Alexander VI's Bulls of Donation and Treaty of Tordesillas while Rome maintained the agreement was restricted to conquered countries; and, contested papal appointments of missionary bishops or vicars apostolic made without its consent, in countries which were never subject to its dominion. As part of the transition, churches served by Goan Catholic priests remained under the jurisdiction of the Patriarch of the East Indies until 1843. Later, this transition was delayed and extended until 1883-12-31. In British Ceylon, it ended in 1887 with the appearance of a papal decree that placed all Catholics in the country under the exclusive jurisdiction of the bishops of the island. That measure met resistance. Alvares and Dr. Pedro Manoel Lisboa Pinto founded in Goa, Portuguese India, an association for the defence of the Padroado. Bartas did not state if there was a response, but wrote that Alvares settled the difficulty by reinventing himself as the head of his schism, appearing in Ceylon, and settling into the main old Goan Portuguese churches in the village of Parapancandel. Alvares was a Roman Catholic Brahmin. Aiya wrote that Alvares, an educated man and the editor of a Catholic journal, was a priest in the Metropolitan Archdiocese of Goa. Later, he returned with the title of Alvares Mar Julius Archbishop of Ceylon, Goa and the Indies, and involved in his schism about 20 parishes in the Roman Catholic Diocese of Jaffna and in the Roman Catholic Archdiocese of Colombo on the island.

Michael Roberts, in Sri Lanka Journal of Social Science, describes three groups within early nationalism in British Ceylon. The most prominent group, "ultra-moderate constitutionalists", with culture and value system significantly westernised, whose main goal was greater participation in government; the second group, "mild-radicals", represented by leaders like Pinto, was a labour movement with political radicalism and interest in more radical trade unions; the third group, "religio-cultural revitalists", traditional values Sinhalese Buddhists "which expressed militant objection to changes produced by Western penetration." Roberts wrote all three groups interacted with the others and had indigenous, Indian, and Burgher people among members, in a complex social tapestry whose members also changed group affiliations over time. A strike at the largest publisher in Colombo, influenced by Pinto's propaganda, took place in September 1893. The next day, Pinto became president of the newly formed printers union. "The main grievances of the printers included low pay and bad working and living conditions."

According to Peter-Ben Smit, in Old Catholic and Philippine Independent Ecclesiologies in History, the Union of Utrecht's (UU) International Old Catholic Bishops' Conference (IBC) discussed a  request for admission in 1902. Smit observed that past "experiences had made ... the  cautious, which in his opinion was a reason for the failure of contacts with groups in ... Ceylon ... and other countries to develop into relationships of full communion." La Croix, Catholic Messenger of Ceylon reported that the Alvares schism ended in 1902. Bartas did not recount the significance of Alvares' ideology, he only noted that the schism, around 1902, intended to convert corporately, to eastern orthodoxy. The cathedral in Colombo had one priest, Alvares, fairly advanced in age. He and his parishioners asked the Holy Synod of the Church of Greece, in Athens, to accept them under its jurisdiction and to send them an officiating priest preaching in Latin and English. Bartas wrote:

But the Greek Holy Synod reflected on information provided by the Archimandrite Germain Kazakis, head of the Orthodox settlement of Calcutta, in addition to the parishioners' application in which they declared themselves Orthodox but still held Roman Catholic liturgies, sacraments, and devotions. According to Smit, "presumably seeing an analogy between the respective emergences of the two churches," Stephen Silva, the  secretary, complained to Gregorio Aglipay of the Philippine Independent Church in 1903 that the  "cannot get sufficient priests to work independently of Rome." Bartas wrote, in 1904 that the Greek Holy Synod "will undoubtedly continue to defer its response" under these conditions. Smit mentioned that the  also failed to create "a relationship with the Greek Orthodox Church in the 1910s." In 1913, Adrian Fortescue described Alvares' faction, in The Lesser Eastern Churches, as "chiefly famous for the begging letters they write and the doubt they cause to people who receive these letters as to who exactly they may be."

Educator

Alvares was a scholar, man of high principles and had a formidable personality. He opened a college where Goan priests were teaching Portuguese, Latin, French, and Philosophy. In 1912, Alvares opened an English School in Panaji. Both operated for a short time.

Social worker
At that time Goa was frequently affected by epidemic like malaria, typhoid, smallpox, cholera and plague. Alvares published a pamphlet on the treatment of cholera. He was concerned about the shortage of food in Goa and appealed to the people to produce cheaper food. He published a booklet about the cultivation of cassava.

Apostle of charity

In 1871, he started a charitable association in Panaji to render help to the poor, beginning with wandering beggars. After a few years he extended the association to other cities in Goa. During the last ten years of his life he concentrated his activities in Panaji. His home accommodated the poor and destitute as well as lepers and tuberculosis patients. He was a beggar without an income. One day Alvares requested a shopkeeper for a contribution, but the shopkeeper spat in the bowl. Without getting angry, Alvares said, "All right, I shall keep this for me. Now, give something for the poor." The shopkeeper contributed generously.

Patriot and saint
This designation was given to Alvares by Goan historians. After joining the Orthodox Church, Alvares was excommunicated from the Roman Catholic Church. He was persecuted by the Catholic Church and the Portuguese Government. Though he was advised by some of his old friends to reunite with the Catholic Church, especially when he was very sick, he refused and stuck to his Orthodox faith.

Martyr

Alvares embraced the Malankara Orthodox Syrian Church. He was excommunicated and persecuted. He was arrested, stripped of his episcopal vestments and taken through the street in his underwear to the police lock-up and placed into a filthy prison cell without a bed or chair. He was forcibly deprived of his cross and the ring, the episcopal insigne he was wearing. He was beaten and presented in the court. But the government could not prove the allegations and he was acquitted. After a few days, he was arrested again and charged with the offence of high treason, but again the Justice found him innocent. He was no longer allowed to use his episcopal vestments and wore a black robe. When he was persecuted, none of the Orthodox Church people were nearby because he had no support or person in Goa from the Malankara Orthodox Syrian Church.

Death
Alvares died of dysentery on 23 September 1923 in Ribandar hospital, a charitable institution. He wished to be buried by Orthodox designates and was specific not to have any Catholic priest for the same. The citizen committee led by the Chief Justice arranged a grand funeral. His body lay in state in the Municipal Hall for 24 hours. The newspapers were full of articles and obituaries about Alvares. Though Alvares was considered an enemy by the government, the Governor General sent his representative. Thousands of people especially poor and beggars paid their last respects. Funeral speeches were made by high dignitaries. The day after his death, a funeral procession wound through all the main roads of Panaji and ended in a secluded corner of St. Inez cemetery where his body was laid to rest without any funeral rites.

Veneration

In 1927, his bones were collected by his friends and admirers, placed in a lead box and reburied, under a marble slab with the inscription ",    " (In memory of priest Antonio Francisco Xavier Alvares, who was very humanitarian missionary and a great patriot) and the largest cross in the cemetery.

In 1967,  Metropolitan Mathews Mar Athanasios, of the Outside Kerala diocese inquired and found the grave during his visit to Goa. A small church was constructed in Ribandar and, in 1979, Alvares' remains were disinterred and placed in the church by Metropolitan Philipose Mar Theophilose of the Bombay diocese.

When the St. Mary's church was reconstructed in the same place, Alvares' remains were moved to the present ossuary which was specially made on the side of the altar by Moran Mar Baselios Mar Thoma Mathews II, Catholicos of the East, on 6 October 2001.

Alvares' remains are entombed at St. Mary's Orthodox church in Ribandar. Although the congregation was small, the Brahmavar Orthodox Community has survived almost a century after Alvares' death. His dukrono, a memorial feast, is celebrated at St. Mary's Orthodox Syrian church in Ribandar on 23 September every year.

Works or publications

Newspapers
Alvares started a number of periodicals; most of them were educative and supportive of the right of the public. He was a critic of the government. Most of the periodicals were banned and forced to stop publications after few years.
A Cruz (in Portuguese)
A Verdade (in Portuguese)
O Brado Indiano (in Portuguese)
O Progresso de Goa (in Portuguese)
Times of Goa (in Portuguese)

Notes and references

Notes

References

Further reading
 

Indian Oriental Orthodox Christians
19th-century Indian Roman Catholic priests
Scholars from Goa
People from Verna, Goa
1836 births
1923 deaths
Christian missionaries in Sri Lanka
Colonial Goa
People acquitted of treason
People excommunicated by the Catholic Church
Syriac Orthodox Church bishops
Oriental Orthodox missionaries
Converts to Oriental Orthodoxy from Roman Catholicism